Deh Bagh (also Romanized as Deh Bāgh; also known as Deh Bākh) is a village in Miyan Darband Rural District, in the Central District of Kermanshah County, Kermanshah Province, Iran. At the 2006 census, its population was 164, in 36 families.

References 

Populated places in Kermanshah County